Good Morning Vietnam 3: The Phoenix Program is a 2014 collaborative album by MF Grimm and Drasar Monumental. It is their third and final official project in the series and serves as a sequel to 2012's Good Morning Vietnam and 2013's Good Morning Vietnam 2: The Golden Triangle.

Track listing
All tracks produced by Drasar Monumental

References

MF Grimm albums
Concept albums
Sequel albums
2014 albums
Vietnam War in popular culture